Martin Blake George Garratt (22 February 1980 – 24 October 2014) was an English professional footballer who played as a midfielder in the Football League for York City, Mansfield Town and Lincoln City.

Career
Born in York, North Yorkshire, Garratt grew up in Middlesbrough and he joined the York City youth system in 1996, turning professional in 1998. He made his first-team debut in a 3–0 defeat to Preston North End on 8 August 1998. He finished the 1998–99 season with 44 appearances and one goal. He trained with Leeds United after the end of the season. He was sacked by York after experiencing personal problems and he was signed by Mansfield Town in 2000. He made his debut in a 1–0 defeat to Barnet and he finished the 1999–2000 season with six appearances for Mansfield. He went on to play for Irish club St Patrick's Athletic, where he made three appearances, before returning to England with Lincoln City in December. He made his debut in a 3–1 victory over Blackpool in the Football League Trophy on 9 January 2001. After making two further appearances for Lincoln he joined Football Conference club Hednesford Town on loan in March. He made his debut in a 4–2 defeat to Doncaster Rovers and he finished the loan spell with two appearances. He joined North Ferriby United in August 2002.

Style of play
Described as a "skilful left sided player", he was able to play as a left midfielder and a left back. York manager Alan Little said of him: "He's like a steam train. He just keeps going. His ability to get about the park has been amazing".

Personal life
As of April 2008, Garratt was under an anti-social behaviour order in Middlesbrough. Prior to his death, he had been diagnosed with schizophrenia.

Death
Garratt died on 24 October 2014 in Middlesbrough. Police officers were called by ambulance service colleagues, to an address in Middlesbrough, on the evening of 24 October, to check on a man who had been taken seriously ill. The ambulance service subsequently reported that he had died. Following an investigation, officers deemed Garratt's death as not suspicious. Garratt's death was later determined as having been caused by effects of alcohol and prescribed drugs.

References

External links

1980 births
2014 deaths
Footballers from York
Footballers from Middlesbrough
English footballers
Association football midfielders
York City F.C. players
Mansfield Town F.C. players
St Patrick's Athletic F.C. players
Lincoln City F.C. players
Hednesford Town F.C. players
North Ferriby United A.F.C. players
English Football League players
League of Ireland players
National League (English football) players
English expatriate footballers
Expatriate association footballers in the Republic of Ireland
English expatriate sportspeople in Ireland
People with schizophrenia
Drug-related deaths in England
Alcohol-related deaths in England